Drew Hyland (born February 9, 1939) is the Charles A. Dana Professor of Philosophy at Trinity College in Hartford, Connecticut.

He has published 6 books and over 40 journal articles. He holds degrees from Princeton University and Pennsylvania State University, where Stanley Rosen was his thesis advisor.

Selected bibliography
 The Origins of Philosophy: Its Rise in Myth and the PreSocratics (1973).
 The Virtue of Philosophy: An Interpretation of Plato's Charmides (1981).
 The Question of Play (1984).
 Philosophy and Sport (1990).
 Finitude and Transcendence in the Platonic Dialogues (1995).
 Plato and the Question of Beauty (2008).

External links
Curriculum Vitae
Boston University visiting faculty biography

1939 births
Living people
American educators
American male non-fiction writers
Writers from Hartford, Connecticut
Princeton Tigers men's basketball players
American men's basketball players